Ludwig Wessely (20 August 1903 – 31 July 1986) was an Austrian hurdler. He competed in the men's 110 metres hurdles at the 1928 Summer Olympics.

References

1903 births
1986 deaths
Athletes (track and field) at the 1928 Summer Olympics
Austrian male hurdlers
Austrian decathletes
Olympic athletes of Austria
Place of birth missing